Federico Chiossi (born 12 March 1999) is an Italian football player.

Club career
He made his Serie C debut for Modena on 22 October 2016 in a game against Venezia.

On 31 January 2019 he joined Robur Siena on loan until the end of the 2018–19 season.

References

External links
 

1999 births
Sportspeople from Modena
Living people
Italian footballers
Italy youth international footballers
Modena F.C. players
A.C.N. Siena 1904 players
Serie C players
Association football midfielders
Footballers from Emilia-Romagna